The Mountain Education Centre of New Zealand (MECNZ) was formally a division of Tai Poutini Polytechnic, located in Wanaka, New Zealand.  Tai Poutini Polytechnic continues to run the Ski Patrol Programme from its Wanaka Campus.

Certificate in Ski Patrol

The Ski Patrol programme is delivered by Tai Poutini Polytechnic located in Wanaka. A ‘classroom’ is also located at Wanaka Treble Cone snowsports area and during the winter season students spend much of the time learning in a snow environment.

This Level 3 Ski Patrol programme begins its practical units in Wanaka in mid February, and runs until late September. An additional three weeks of distance learning forms the initial part of the programme.

Core elements of this programme include:

 pre-hospital emergency care (first aid)
 avalanche stage 1 and back country touring
 meteorology
 advanced skiing or snowboarding
 ski patrol operations
 professional teamwork and ethics
 rescue toboggans
 basic mountaineering and rope techniques
 chair lift evacuation
 snow blasting

Location

The Tai Poutini Polytechnic ski patrol programme is based in Wanaka.

External links
Tai Poutini Polytechnic website

Wānaka
Educational organisations based in New Zealand